Boneita Springs is an unincorporated community in Meade County, in the U.S. state of South Dakota.

History
Boneita Springs was laid out in 1908, and named from the Spanish diminutive meaning "beautiful" springs. A post office called Boneita Springs was in operation from 1908 until 1944. The name

References

Unincorporated communities in Meade County, South Dakota
Unincorporated communities in South Dakota